George Bertrand Edwards (30 January 1855 – 4 February 1911) was an Australian politician. He was a member of the Australian House of Representatives representing the Division of South Sydney for the Free Trade Party from 1901 to 1906 and the Division of North Sydney for the Liberal Party from 1910 until his death in 1911.

Edwards was born and raised in Hobart, Tasmania, the son of a tobacconist and was educated at Christ College. He became a journalist with the Tasmanian Tribune at the age of 20. He later managed the new Hobart office of Launceston newspaper The Examiner  1882-83, then in 1884 briefly went to Sydney to run the Peacock Jam Company branch there,  but returned to Hobart the next year to run the Launceston office of Hobart newspaper The Mercury. He married the eldest daughter of jam magnate George Peacock in October 1885. He later worked on the general staff of The Mercury, was chief Hansard reporter for two sessions of the Federal Council of Australasia and was editor of the Mercury-owned Tasmanian Mail weekly magazine in 1888-89.

Edwards then managed the Peacock Jam Company's Melbourne branch until purchasing the company's Sydney operations in 1894, subsequently operating that business in partnership with Herbert Peacock. He also purchased 60 acres of land adjoining Ku-ring-gai Chase National Park for a house and fruitgrowing operation. He was a supporter of free trade policies and an unsuccessful Free Trade candidate at the 1898 election.

In 1901, he contested the first federal election as the Free Trade candidate for South Sydney, and won, defeating state Labor leader James McGowen. His platform included support for a White Australia policy and a federal old age pension. In parliament, Edwards chaired the Decimal Coinage Commission and was a member of the Royal Commission on Navigation. Edwards was an early supporter of decimalisation and metrification, and moved several motions calling on Australia to adopt the metric system and a decimal currency. He retired at the 1906 election due to a mix of health concerns and business commitments. Peacock & Co (Edwards' Sydney operation) amalgamated with two other major jam manufacturers to form Henry Jones' Co-operative, Ltd. (later Henry Jones IXL) in early 1910, and later that year he returned to the House of Representatives as the Liberal member for North Sydney.

Edwards was killed when an acetylene gasometer exploded at his property in Turramurra on 4 February 1911. A mechanic named John Graham was also killed in the explosion, which was overheard by Edwards' daughter Annie. The explosion destroyed the brick structure in which the gasometer was housed, and the victims' bodies were found some distance from the gasometer, both with severe head injuries. A coronial inquiry returned a verdict of accidental death.

References

Free Trade Party members of the Parliament of Australia
Commonwealth Liberal Party members of the Parliament of Australia
Members of the Australian House of Representatives for South Sydney
Members of the Australian House of Representatives for North Sydney
Members of the Australian House of Representatives
1855 births
1911 deaths
20th-century Australian politicians
Accidental deaths in New South Wales
Industrial accident deaths
Politicians from Hobart
Deaths from explosion